Two ships in the United States Navy have been named USS Little for Captain George Little.

In 1940 she was later redesignated a high-speed transport with the hull symbol APD-4. She was sunk in action off Guadalcanal in 1942.
, was a  destroyer, launched in 1944. She was sunk in action during the Battle of Okinawa in 1945.

United States Navy ship names